Tetrodon may refer to:
 a synonym of Dendrobium, a genus of orchid
Tetraodon, a genus of puffer fish